Gregoria Montoya y Patricio (18631896) was a Filipina revolutionary who fought during the Philippine Revolution. To avenge her husband, also a revolutionary who died during the Revolution, Montoya led a 30-member unit of the Katipunan with "a bolo on one hand and the Katipunan flag in the other" at the Battle of Binakayan-Dalahican. She was killed during the battle, but her leadership led to a vindicated Filipino victory.

References

1863 births
1896 deaths
Katipunan
People of the Philippine Revolution
Women in war in the Philippines
Women in 19th-century warfare